Paul Lamar Freeman Jr. (June 29, 1907 – April 17, 1988) was a United States Army four-star general who served as Commander in Chief, United States Army Europe/Commander, Central Army Group from 1962 to 1965 and Commanding General, Continental Army Command from 1965 to 1967.

Military career

Freeman was born June 29, 1907, in the Philippine Islands, son of Paul Lamar and Emma (Rosenbaum) Freeman. He graduated from the United States Military Academy on June 13, 1929, with a class ranking of 213 and commissioned in the infantry. His first assignment was at Fort Sam Houston with the 9th Infantry Regiment. While in Texas, he married Mary Ann Fishburn on August 18, 1932, and had one daughter. A month after getting married, he reported to Fort Benning to attend the Officer's Course at the Infantry School, then was assigned to Tianjin (then called Tientsin) in China with the 15th Infantry Regiment until 1936. Upon his return to the United States he was assigned to Fort Washington, Maryland and was a company commander in the 12th Infantry Regiment, and subsequently returned to Fort Benning for the Tank Course. He then spent a year as company and battalion Maintenance Officer with the 66th Infantry Regiment.

At the time of the United States entry into World War II, Freeman was in China again, in Beijing as a language student and concurrently as Assistant Military Attaché at the American embassy. Shortly after the attack on Pearl Harbor, he was assigned to the United States Military Mission to China, and a few months later reassigned to the staff of the China India Burma Theater as an instructor to Chinese and Indian Armies. He remained on the theater staff until September 1943, when he returned to Washington D.C., as a staff officer. Towards the end of the war in late 1944, he was sent to Rio de Janeiro, Brazil as Director of Arms Training for the Joint Brazil-United States Military Commission, a position he held until October 1947. He returned to the Army General Staff in Washington D.C., working in the Latin American Branch of the Plans and Operating Division, then from 1948 to 1950, served as a member of the Joint Brazil-United States Military Commission, and was also a member of the United States Army delegation to the Inter-American Defense Board.

With the outbreak of the Korean War, Freeman was deployed to that theater as the Commander of the 23rd Infantry Regiment in the 2nd Infantry Division. He led the regiment in the retreat from Kunu-ri in November 1950. In early February he led the 23rd Regimental Combat Team in the Battle of the Twin Tunnels on 1 February 1951 and then at Battle of Chipyong-ni from 13 to 15 February 1951. At Chipyong-ni the 23rd RCT was cut off and surrounded by elements of five Chinese divisions, which launched fanatical all-out assaults against them. He was wounded on the first night of the engagement by mortar shrapnel in his left calf. Although he expected to return to the 23rd Infantry Regiment after his wounds healed, he did not resume command of the regiment, having been returned to the US to recover.

Returning from the war, he attended the National War College, graduating in 1952. In 1955, he assumed command of the 2nd Infantry Division, and in 1956 took command of the 4th Infantry Division, at that time stationed at Fort Lewis, Washington. After his second division command ended in 1957, he served as Senior Army Member to the Weapons System Evaluation Group in Washington D.C. He was named Deputy Commanding General for Reserve Forces (CONARC) in 1960. On May 1, 1962 he received his fourth star, and assumed duties as Commander in Chief, United States Army Europe/Commander, Central Army Group, serving in that capacity until 1965. His final assignment was Commanding General, United States Continental Army Command from 1965 to 1967.

Freeman retired from the army in 1967, and died in Monterey California on April 17, 1988.

Awards and decorations
Badges
  Combat Infantryman Badge with second award
  Parachutist Badge
  Army Staff Identification Badge
Decorations
  Distinguished Service Cross
  Army Distinguished Service Medal
  Silver Star with one oak leaf cluster
  Legion of Merit
  Bronze Star Medal with three oak leaf clusters and "V" device
  Air Medal
  Purple Heart
Service Medals
  American Defense Service Medal with star
  American Campaign Medal
  Asiatic-Pacific Campaign Medal with four campaign stars and arrowhead device
  World War II Victory Medal
  Army of Occupation Medal
  National Defense Service Medal with star
  Korean Service Medal with four campaign stars
Foreign Awards
   Brazilian Order of Military Merit (Ordem do Mérito Militar)
  French Legion of Honor in degree of commander
  French Croix de Guerre with palm
  Philippine Liberation Medal with two stars
  United Nations Korea Medal
Unit Awards
  Army Presidential Unit Citation
  Presidential Unit Citation (Philippines)
  Republic of Korea Presidential Unit Citation

References

External links

 
Militaria Museum fact sheet

Chevaliers of the Légion d'honneur
1907 births
1988 deaths
United States Army personnel of World War II
United States Army personnel of the Korean War
United States Army generals
United States Military Academy alumni
Recipients of the Distinguished Service Medal (US Army)
Recipients of the Legion of Merit
Recipients of the Silver Star
Recipients of the Distinguished Service Cross (United States)
Recipients of the Croix de Guerre 1939–1945 (France)
Recipients of the Air Medal
Recipients of the Order of Military Merit (Brazil)
People from Monterey, California
National War College alumni
Military personnel from California